Crafoord is a Swedish surname. Notable people with the surname include:
 Carl-George Crafoord (1921–2006), Swedish diplomat
 Clarence Crafoord (1899–1984), Swedish cardiovascular surgeon
 Göran Crafoord (born 1939), Swedish sailor
 Greta Crafoord (born 2000), Swedish pair skater, twin sister of John
 Holger Crafoord (1908–1982), Swedish industrialist
 John Crafoord (born 2000), Swedish pair skater, twin brother of Greta
 Josefin Crafoord (born 1973), Swedish television and radio host
 Wille Crafoord (born 1966), Swedish musician

See also
 
 Crafoord Prize
 Crawford (disambiguation)